Andres Lepik (born on 27 April 1957 in Haapsalu) is an Estonian actor and theatre director.

In 1982 he graduated from the Tallinn State Conservatory's Performing Arts Department. From 1982 until 1994 and from 1995 until 2000, he worked at Ugala Theatre (1995–1998 as its artistical manager). From 2000 until 2003, he worked at the Endla Theatre. Since 2004, he has been a freelance actor. Besides theatre roles he has played also in several films and on television.

Awards:
 1991: Ants Lauter prize

Filmography

 1987: Tants aurukatla ümber
 1982: Need vanad armastuskirjad
 2015: Vehkleja
 2017: Mehetapja/Süütu/Vari
 2018: Põrgu Jaan 
 2019: Johannes Pääsukese tõeline elu
 2019: Tõde ja õigus
 2020: Vee peal
 2022: Erik Kivisüda

References

Living people
1957 births
Estonian male stage actors
Estonian male film actors
Estonian male television actors
20th-century Estonian male actors
21st-century Estonian male actors
Estonian theatre directors
Estonian Academy of Music and Theatre alumni
People from Haapsalu